Brighton Line can refer to:
 BMT Brighton Line, a rapid transit line of the New York City Subway
 Brighton Main Line, a railway line between London and Brighton, England